Alisha Pradhan (born 1993 or 1994) is a Bangladeshi actress, television presenter, and businesswoman. She rose to prominence as a teenager on television. She later starred in several films, most notably with Emon in director Chashi Nazrul Islam's final two pictures, Antaranga and Bhul Jodi Hoy. Pradhan retired from acting in 2017.

Biography

Early life
Alisha Pradhan was born to Monir and Hosna Pradhan, both businesspeople. She is the second of three children, born between older sister Faiza and younger brother Ryan. She grew up in Dhaka, Bangladesh. From age 8, she studied classical dance at Bulbul Academy for Fine Arts. Later she learned Western and Latin dance and hip hop.

In 2008, at age 14, Pradhan began her show business career by modeling in a television commercial for Cova chocolate bars. She returned to the form two years later in an advertisement for Bangladeshi soft drink Uro Cola with actor Riaz, and did a second commercial for the beverage with Emon in 2012.

While still in school, she appeared in more than 30 dramas and serials on the small screen, including NTV's Dakhinayaner Din, Fazlur Rahman's Swapnochura, Ferdous Hasan Rana's Dahan, and Mostofa Sarwar Farooki's First Date. In 2011, she performed an item number for a film by director Raffael Ahsan, then titled 69 Patla Khan Lane. Legal objections by the owner of that address delayed the film, and it would not be released until December 2015, under the new title Noy Choy.

She completed her A-levels in mid-2012.

Film career
Pradhan made a guest appearance in the film Eito Bhalobasha, which was released in early 2013. Meanwhile, she became a presenter for broadcasts of the 2013 Bangladesh Premier League (BPL) cricket season.

Director Chashi Nazrul Islam saw her work as a presenter for the BPL and invited her to co-star with Emon in his film Bhul Jodi Hoy. Shooting took place in May 2013. While it was in post-production, she signed a four-film contract with Carnival Motion Pictures, a new production company directed by her mother. Antaranga, the first film under their banner, was again with Emon and under Islam's direction. In it she played a double role, Tamanna, a conventional Bangladeshi character dependent on her family in a patriarchal society, and Banya, a more independent, rebellious character. Filming began in December 2013 at the Bangladesh Film Development Corporation. Islam died without completing the picture. Finishing it fell to his assistant, Tarek Shikdar. It was edited by Pradhan's sister Faiza, who had studied film in India.

Shooting of Pradhan's third film, Ojante Bhalobasha, directed by A J Rana, began in January 2014. In it she played the role of Kajol, "a simple middle class female". In March 2014, with several pictures in the can, but none yet released, filming began on the second Carnival Motion Pictures property, Zakir Hossain Raju's Premer Kajal. She played opposite Shipon in it. As of 2021, it is yet to be released.

Antaranga hit cinemas in November 2015, making it Pradhan's debut film in a lead role. Bhul Jodi Hoy, though filmed earlier, didn't premiere until January 2016. Antaranga was not very successful at the box office, but after its release director Shahin Sumon signed Pradhan to star in his film Probashi Don opposite Symon Sadik. The intention was to shoot most of the film abroad, starting in early 2016, but that plan became snarled in visa complications. As of November 2017, it was still in pre-production.

Ojante Bhalobasha was released in May 2016. The production house, Surjo Chalachitra, described it as a flop. Director Rana said he had hoped to at least break even, "But in hindsight, I was thinking the impossible". Pradhan announced in December 2017 that she was retiring from acting.

Beyond acting
As of 2018, Pradhan is general secretary of Bangladesh Heritage Crafts Foundation, a nonprofit organization that aims to boost the traditional crafts of Bangladesh, such as jamdani and other textiles, shital pati woven mats, and pottery.

In July 2019, Pradhan became managing director of a new internet-based television channel, HerNet TV, focused on women's wellbeing. Her mother is the chairman of the company.

Filmography

Films 

==See also==
 Cinema of Bangladesh

References 

Living people
1993 births
People from Comilla
21st-century Bangladeshi actresses
Bengali television actresses
Bangladeshi film actresses